Jamie Morgan may refer to:

Jamie Morgan (tennis) (born 1971), former Australian professional tennis player
Jamie Morgan (musician), British musician and photographer